Giria may refer to

 Giria (moth), a genus of moths of the family Noctuidae
 Giria, India, village in West Bengal, India
 The Battle of Giria